Terézvárosi Torna Club was a Hungarian football club from the town of Terézváros, Budapest. Terézvárosi TC was founded as Fővárosi TC in 1902.

History
Terézvárosi TC debuted as Fővárosi TC in the 1904 season of the Hungarian League and finished ninth.

Name Changes 
1902–1909: Fővárosi Torna Club
1909–1926: Terézvárosi Torna Club
1914: merger with Globus Terézvárosi SC
1921: merger with VIII. kerületi SC
1922: merger with Jutagyári TE 
1926–1932: Terézvárosi FC
1931: merger with Józsefváros FC
1932: dissolved and merger with Nemzeti SC as VII. ker. Nemzeti Sportkedvelők Köre
1945: re-founded
1945-1945: VI. ker. Barátság
1945–1949: Terézvárosi Torna Club
1949–1951: Szerszámgépgyár
1951–?: Vasas Szerszámgépgyár

References

External links
 Profil

1902 establishments in Hungary
1950s disestablishments in Hungary
Association football clubs established in 1902
Association football clubs disestablished in 1953
Defunct football clubs in Hungary